The Battle of Altenkirchen (4 June 1796) saw two Republican French divisions commanded by Jean Baptiste Kléber attack a wing of the Habsburg Austrian army led by Duke Ferdinand Frederick Augustus of Württemberg. A frontal attack combined with a flanking maneuver forced the Austrians to retreat. Three future Marshals of France played significant roles in the engagement: François Joseph Lefebvre as a division commander, Jean-de-Dieu Soult as a brigadier and Michel Ney as leader of a flanking column. The battle occurred during the War of the First Coalition, part of a larger conflict called the Wars of the French Revolution.

The French opened the Rhine Campaign of 1796 by ordering Kléber to attack south out of his bridgehead at Düsseldorf. After Kléber won sufficient maneuver room on the east bank of the Rhine River, Jean Baptiste Jourdan was supposed to join him with the remainder of the Army of Sambre-et-Meuse. But this was only a distraction. When the Austrians under Archduke Charles, Duke of Teschen moved north to oppose Jourdan, Jean Victor Marie Moreau would cross the Rhine far to the south with the Army of Rhin-et-Moselle. Kléber carried out his part of the scheme to perfection, allowing Jourdan to cross the Rhine at Neuwied on 10 June. The next action was the Battle of Wetzlar on 15–16 June.

References

Battles of the War of the First Coalition
Battles of the French Revolutionary Wars
Battles involving Austria
Battles involving France
Conflicts in 1796
History of the Rhineland
1796 in the Holy Roman Empire
Battles in Rhineland-Palatinate
Battles inscribed on the Arc de Triomphe